Angelo Tarchi may refer to:
 Angelo Tarchi (composer)
 Angelo Tarchi (politician)